Fords Prairie is an unincorporated community and census-designated place (CDP) in Lewis County, Washington, United States. The population was 2,234 at the 2020 census.

History
The area was originally called "Tasunshun" by the Upper Chehalis tribe, the Quiyaisk. Fords Prairie was named after Judge Sidney S. Ford, Sr. and his wife Nancy, who were among the earliest white pioneers who settled north of the Columbia River in 1846 in what was then a part of Oregon Territory. Their  Ford Donation Land Claim abutting the Chehalis River was the center of what became known as Fords Prairie, which became an important travelling stop between the Columbia River and Puget Sound.

Geography
The city of Centralia borders Fords Prairie to the south, and Grand Mound in Thurston County borders the community to the north. Interstate 5 forms the eastern edge of the CDP, with access from Exit 82 (Harrison Avenue) in Centralia.

The community sits on the east side of the Chehalis River, which flows northwest to the Pacific Ocean at Grays Harbor.

Demographics

As of the census of 2000, there were 1,961 people, 785 households, and 588 families residing in the CDP. The population density was 502.0 people per square mile (193.6/km2). There were 820 housing units at an average density of 209.9/sq mi (81.0/km2). The racial makeup of the CDP was 93.83% White, 0.05% African American, 1.07% Native American, 1.53% Asian, 0.31% Pacific Islander, 1.43% from other races, and 1.78% from two or more races. Hispanic or Latino of any race were 3.62% of the population.

There were 785 households, out of which 26.0% had children under the age of 18 living with them, 61.7% were married couples living together, 10.4% had a female householder with no husband present, and 25.0% were non-families. 19.6% of all households were made up of individuals, and 10.1% had someone living alone who was 65 years of age or older. The average household size was 2.49 and the average family size was 2.83.

In the CDP, the population was spread out, with 21.5% under the age of 18, 8.8% from 18 to 24, 20.7% from 25 to 44, 29.3% from 45 to 64, and 19.8% who were 65 years of age or older. The median age was 44 years. For every 100 females, there were 92.3 males. For every 100 females age 18 and over, there were 93.0 males.

The median income for a household in the CDP was $42,927, and the median income for a family was $47,829. Males had a median income of $34,073 versus $26,344 for females. The per capita income for the CDP was $21,610. About 4.2% of families and 7.2% of the population were below the poverty line, including 7.9% of those under age 18 and 7.0% of those age 65 or over.

Parks and recreation
The Fort Borst Park complex, which includes the Borst Home and Pioneer Park Dog Park, is situated south of the area. The Discovery Trail, opened in 2006, meanders inside the riparian zone next to the Chehalis River, is northwest of the region.

Politics
Fords Prairie is recognized as being majority Republican.

The results for the 2020 U.S. Presidential Election for the Winlock voting district were as follows:

 Donald J. Trump (Republican) - 508 (64.55%)
 Joe Biden (Democrat) - 254 (32.27%)
 Jo Jorgensen (Libertarian) - 14 (1.78%)
 Other candidates - 3 (0.38%)
 Write-in candidate - 8 (1.02%)

References

Census-designated places in Lewis County, Washington
Census-designated places in Washington (state)